The 1066 Country Walk is a waymarked long-distance footpath or recreational walk in southern England, United Kingdom.

Length of the route 

The route 

The route commemorates 1066, the year of the Battle of Hastings, and seeks to link the places and the people of that important year. It runs through East Sussex from Pevensey where William of Normandy gathered his invading army of Normans and prepared to meet King Harold to Rye, East Sussex, passing through Battle, East Sussex.

The walk is mainly low level and passes through rolling countryside beside oast houses, windmills and parts of the South Downs.

It links with the Saxon Shore Way.

External links 

Long Distance Walkers Association entry

Further reading 
The 1066 Country Walk Book official guide by Brian Smailes. Challenge Publications 

Long-distance footpaths in England
Footpaths in East Sussex